Rafael Orozco could refer to:
Rafael Orozco (pianist) (1946–1996), Spanish classical pianist
Rafael Orozco Maestre (1954–1992), Colombian vallenato singer
Rafael Orozco (footballer) (1922–2015), Mexican association football player